Gerry Wolff (23 June 1920 – 16 February 2005) was a German actor. He was born in Bremen, Germany and died in Oranienburg, Brandenburg, Germany.

Selected filmography
 Bärenburger Schnurre (1957)
 Naked Among Wolves (1963)
 Tecumseh (1972)
 Elective Affinities (1974)
 Anton the Magician (1978)
 So Many Dreams (1986)

External links

1920 births
2005 deaths
Actors from Bremen
German male television actors
German male film actors